David Maurice Frederick Newman is a Church of England priest and retired Archdeacon of Loughborough.

Newman was born in Woking on 23 August 1954, educated at Hertford College, Oxford (he gained his MA Oxon) and ordained in 1980. After curacies at Christ Church, Orpington and St Mary's, Bushbury he held incumbencies at All Saints, Ockbrook, Derbyshire, Emmanuel, Loughborough and St Mary-in-Charnwood. He retired effective 27 March 2017.

References

1954 births
People from Woking
Alumni of Hertford College, Oxford
Archdeacons of Loughborough
Living people